Renee Gerard Japp Troost (born 6 June 1988) is a Dutch professional footballer who plays as a centre back for Rijnsburgse Boys in the Dutch Topklasse. He formerly played for Almere City, AGOVV Apeldoorn and Breiðablik.

References

1988 births
Living people
People from Bussum
Dutch footballers
Eerste Divisie players
Derde Divisie players
AGOVV Apeldoorn players
Almere City FC players
Úrvalsdeild karla (football) players
Dutch expatriate footballers
Expatriate footballers in Iceland
Dutch expatriate sportspeople in Iceland
Association football central defenders
Footballers from North Holland